Golden Rock Shandy is a market square  at Golden Rock, Tiruchirappalli in Tamil Nadu, India.

Background 
This weekly shandy was established in 1926 during the British regime to supply household essentials to residents of the colony who were mostly employees of railways and their families, living far away from the heart of Tiruchi city.

Though being a farmers' market, it initially supplied vegetables only, as the population of colony grew it also started supplying all kinds of dry goods and wet goods including consumables, metalwares, pots, clothing, furnitures, meat, fish, poultry, livestock and electronic gadgets and miscellaneous items.

Schedule 
Initially, the market would be bustling every fortnight and on Sundays from dawn to dusk because the railway employees were paid salaries in cash twice in a month. When the fortnight payment system was scrapped and salaries were given in cash the 3rd day of each month, the market was conducted only on those days, abandoning the biweekly schedule. For the past few years, the market has been open only on Sundays, as the employees' salaries were credited directly into bank accounts.

Legacy 
The market square is visited by about 30,000 people from various parts of the district including BHEL Township, OFT, K. K. Nagar, Ponmalaipatti, Ariyamangalam, Kattur, Melakalkandarkottai, Kilakalkandarkottai and Kottapattu.

See also 
 Gandhi Market
 Koyambedu Wholesale Market Complex

References

External links 

Economy of Tiruchirappalli
Wholesale markets in India
1926 establishments in India